Charms of the Night Sky is the tenth album by the trumpeter Dave Douglas. It was released on the German Winter & Winter label in 1998 and contains performances by Douglas, Greg Cohen, Mark Feldman and Guy Klucevsek.

Reception

The AllMusic review by Steve Loewy stated: "Trumpeter Dave Douglas has participated in so many styles of music that listing them all would be mesmerizing. Some of his best work has been performed in free style and hard bop jazz groups. Here, he charts a different path, albeit one that he has pursued successfully before, in a mellow, lovely vein".

Track listing
All compositions by Dave Douglas except as indicated
 "Charms Of The Night Sky" - 7:32
 "Bal Masque" - 3:48
 "Sea Change" - 5:18
 "Facing West" - 4:23
 "Dance In Thy Soul (for Charlie Haden)" - 8:07
 "Little One" (Hancock) - 4:11
 "Wild Coffee" (Klucevsek) - 1:14
 "The Girl With The Rose Hips" (Klucevsek) - 2:51
 "Decafinata" (Klucevsek) - 2:27
 "Poveri Fiori" (Cilea) - 2:41
 "Odyssey" - 6:28
 "Twisted" - 3:37
 "Codetta" - 2:53
Recorded at Avatar Studios, New York City on September 18 and 19, 1997

Personnel
Dave Douglas: trumpet
Mark Feldman: violin
Guy Klucevsek: accordion
Greg Cohen: acoustic bass

References

1998 albums
Dave Douglas (trumpeter) albums
Winter & Winter Records albums